Right Through Me is the second extended play by South Korean band Day6 (Even of Day), a sub-unit of Day6 consisting of members Young K, Wonpil, and Dowoon. It was released by Studio J and JYP Entertainment on July 5, 2021. The album contains seven tracks co-written by Young K, Wonpil, and the producer Hong Ji-sang, including the lead single of the same name, "Right Through Me".

Track listing

Charts

Weekly charts

Monthly charts

References 

2021 EPs
Day6 EPs
JYP Entertainment EPs
Korean-language EPs